Shohimardon (also Shakhimardan) is a village and a subdivision (rural community) of Fergana District, Fergana Region in eastern Uzbekistan. It is an exclave of Uzbekistan, surrounded by Kyrgyzstan, in a valley in the Pamiro-Alai mountains. The name means ‘King of Men’ in Persian. The river Shohimardonsoy flows through the exclave.
There are two villages: Shohimardon and Yordon.

Shohimardon is a popular resort with several sanatoriums, and an active place of pilgrimage. According to one folk legend, the Caliph Ali was buried in Shohimardon.

Shakhimardan City Resort is situated at 1975m above sea level, 155 km from Ferghana, in the picturesque mountainous district. The Kuliqurbon or Blue Lake is seven kilometers southeast of Shakhimardan. It was formed in 1766 after a series of extreme earthquakes. The lake is located at an altitude of 1,724 metres. It's 170 m long, 60 m tall, 5–10 m deep. The cableway continues to the lake for two kilometres.

The Uzbek poet Hamza Hakimzade Niyazi lived and worked in Shohimardon until he was stoned to death there in 1929.

Geography 
Shohimardon is an exclave of Uzbekistan, surrounded by Kyrgyzstan's Batken region, Kadamjay district, in Eastern Central Asia. Its mountainous topography, with no substantial naturally flat ground, is part of the Alay mountains range.

It is one of 4 exclaves of Uzbekistan located in Kyrgyzstan, including Sokh, Chon-Qora (Qalacha), and Jani-Ayil. And the largest one with the area of 90 km2 (35 sq mi) after Sokh 325 km2 (125 sq mi).

Mountains and rivers 
It is located in a valley on the northern slopes of the Ala mountains at an altitude of about 1550 meters.Highest points of exclave are summits Almalik 2841 m, Chivirgan 2465 m, and Qizil-Gaza 2568 m. On the western side of Shohimardon village located Kozdibel mountains.

Several rivers flow through the exclave, the largest being  Koksu,  Oqsu, and the Shohimardonsoy. After Koksu joins to Oqsu near to village park, river Shohimardonsoy starts, which flows down to Margilan. Main source of rivers are glaciers in Kyrgyzstan. Oqsu's flow starts from glaciers Northern Alauddin, Archa-Bashy, and Western Karakazyk. At the beginning river called Alauddin, after Alauddin comes together with Archa-Bashy stream it gets name Oqsu. The stream Dugoba joins it in Yordon village.

Climate 
Lowest temperature in January -23.0 °C. Highest temperature in July +42.0 °C. The average amount of moisture falling as rain and snow is 350–400 mm. The average temperature in July is 22 °C, in January from -3 to 3 °C.

Flora and Fauna 
In the water of Shohimardonsoy lives Triplophysa ferganaensis, an endemic fish species to the Shohimardonsoy river. Mountains are covered with wood. Most part of flat land is in use for agricultural plants.

Demographics 
The population of the exclave in 1993 was about 5,100 people, of which 91% were Uzbeks, and 9% were Kyrgyz. Today around 10,000 people live in exclave, mostly ethnic Uzbeks. Statistical information about the population of Shohimardon (and Yardan) at the end of 19th century and at the first two decades of 20th century:

Education 
One preschool establishment and one public school in Shohimardon town and one preschool establishment and one public school in Yordon village are all public educational establishments in subdivision. In addition to public education, private tutoring courses in language training, and preparing for university exams are available.

Health 
There are two hospital in subdivision. Government continuously subsidies most educational and health services, to keep better life quality in isolated Shohimardon.

Religion 
Islam is main religion in all villages of exclave. Sunni Islam of Hanafi school is denomination. There is one mosque in use.

Hamza Hakimzade Niyazi was stoned to death in the town of Shohimardon, by Islamic fundamentalists on the accusation of anti-religious activities.

Transport 
Shohimardon is connected to mainland Uzbekistan via highway Ferghana-Shohimardon 4R-144. From Shohimardon town center local road R-144a leads to Qurbonkul (Blue lake) and R-144b to Dugoba mount camp.

There are no public airports in Shohimardon. Most tourists from abroad or other parts of Uzbekistan who arrive by air land at Ferghana International airport, then make the transfer by car. It is proposed to build small airport for light aircraft to develop tourism in subdivision and directly connect it with Uzbekistan without crossing Kyrgyzstan's border, as it was built in another isolated exclave - Sokh.

Today there is no railway in Shohimardon. The closest railway station is located in Ferghana city.

Two rivers and several streams flow through Shohimardon, but there is no major water transport, and no port or harbour.

Public transport 
Bus service on the route "Fergana - Shohimardon" was stopped in August 2013. From April 25, 2017 the service in this direction has been restarted. There are 2 Isuzu buses on the route and it is served by "Fergana Golden Valley Navkari" LLC. Also there is cableway to Qurbonkul for 2 kilometers, mainly located in Kyrgyzstan territory.

Economy

Agriculture 
Mountainous territory and lower average temperature compared to mainland Uzbekistan, agriculture in Shohimardon is tough and not suitable for most agriculture plants like wheat or cotton that popular on Uzbekistan and Kyrgyzstan's flat lands.

Apple, apricot and peach tree gardens are common in farmlands.

Livestock, dairy products, meat, vegetable production are enough for only internal consumption and satisfies only domestic demand.

Tourism 
During the Soviet time Shohimardon was one of the main destinations of Fergana valley's people to travel. After Independence of former Soviet Republics border issues between Uzbekistan and Kyrgyzstan significantly decreased flow of tourists into Shohimardon. Today most of camps, tourist bases and sanatoriums are abandoned. But local people are opening new guest houses to attract more tourists.

There is one museum in Shohimardon, located in Shohimardon town park, at the crossing of Koksu and Oqsu rivers. Museum is named after the Uzbek author and scholar Hamza Hakimzade Niyazi. It was opened in 1989 by UNESCO for the 100th anniversary of Niyazi. The collection of museum consists of lifetime stories and books of Niyazi and materials regarding to Shohimardon's history. The museum's mission is to promote the culture, history, and nature of little exclave Shohimardon and its people.

Shohimardon is developing as the destination of pilgrimage tourism as well as eco tourism. It is home for three famous figures of history, and two of them are religious characters that Central Asian people give a lot respect. And there are 3 tombs in shrine complex:

 Hazret Ali's tomb
 Shahi Talib (4th generation of Hazret Ali)'s tomb
 Hamza Hakimzade Niyazi's tomb

The tourist season is from June to September. Season creates jobs for hundreds of locals. Seasonal restaurants, hotels, stores, souvenir shops open to service tourists.

Medical tourism is the another prospect for Shohimardon for its fresh air, clear nature and water.

Labour migration 
High rate of unemployment in exclave's villages results in fleeing to mainland Uzbekistan or foreign countries. Most youth men travels to Russia for labour immigration. Fergana is the first location inside of Uzbekistan.

Energy 
Shohimardon is rich to hydroelectric energy recources. Rivers that flow through high mountains are great potential to build small hydroelectric power stations.

Uzbekhydroenergo and the Hydro4U consortium receive a €1 million buyout for the purchase of equipment for a new hydroelectric power station. The parties signed the agreement on June 21, 2022, at the annual meeting of the participants of the Hydro4U small power plant construction project. The projected small hydroelectric power station has capacity of 2.2 MW near the village of Shakhimardan.

The power plant, after launching in 2023, will annually generate 12.8 million kWh of electricity. The project to supply 2,100 households with a population of 7,000 also includes additional capacity for production.

The implementation of the project is estimated at 2 million euros. Of these, half will be allocated by the EU in the form of a grant for the purchase of technological equipment. Another 12 billion soums came from the Uzbek side.

Uzbekhydroenergo has also negotiated a micro hydropower stand with the Austrian company Global Hydro. It is noted that the installation of block-modular systems can reduce construction costs by about 500 thousand euros.

Culture 
The culture of Shohimardon is the part of Uzbek traditional customs in Ferghana valley. People of Shohimardon celebrates traditional holidays as same as in Uzbekistan, including Nowruz, Islamic holidays, Independence Day of Uzbekistan and New Year's Day.

The beautiful nature of Shohimardon attracts painters from different locations, mainly from former Soviet republics. That's why it is easy to see paintings of Shohimardon among the artworks of Uzbekistan and Central Asia's most famous painters.

Shohimardon is famous among singers and poets of Uzbekistan too. Several songs has created regarding to the mountains and people of Shohimardon. Poets like National poet of Uzbekistan Muhammad Yusuf made Shohimardon even more famous around country by poems.

See also 

 Sokh, another Uzbekistan exclave in Kyrgyzstan
 Sarvan, a Tajikistan exclave in Uzbekistan
 Vorukh, a Tajikistan exclave in Kyrgyzstan
 Batken Region enclaves and exclaves

References

Populated places in Fergana Region
Enclaves and exclaves